The St. Francis Square is a complex of three buildings located in Ortigas Center, Mandaluyong, Philippines. Groundbreaking and construction began in 1998 and was completed in 2000. Due to some controversies regarding the St. Francis Square Group of Companies, construction and the finishing of interiors were halted. Construction resumed in 2009 and the building was finished in 2011.

Complex

BSA Twin Towers 
There are three buildings within the complex, but the most notable are the main two towers. Topped off since 2000, yet completed in 2011, the two towers became the fourth-tallest buildings in the country. The two towers supposedly have a rooftop observation deck or a sky garden on their pyramid roofs. They also serve as a radio transmitter and secondary studio facilities of the FM radio stations 90.7 Love Radio, 101.1 Yes The Best and 96.3 Easy Rock, as well as temporary studios of AM radio station DZRH and community-formatted national FM station Radyo Natin, all owned by Manila Broadcasting Company. At night, there is an neon light display at the top of the buildings, with logos of the St Francis Group of Companies, AUX Aircon, and HKTV (HongKong TV) seen on the roofs, giving an iconic look to the Ortigas skyline.

St. Francis Square Mall 
The St. Francis Square Mall is a four-storey building within the St. Francis Square complex. It is popularly known in the Metropolitan Manila for its advertisement jingle for the Super Tiangge shopping area which is located in this mall. The mall and the Twin Towers are separated by a massive parking lot that caters to the customers of the mall and nearby establishments.

In June 2019, the Super Tiangge area, the second and third levels of the mall, was vacated and closed for conversion as commercial and office space.

See also 

 List of tallest buildings in the Philippines

References

External links 
 St. Francis Square - Official website
 BSA Twin Towers - Official website

Office buildings completed in 2000
Skyscrapers in Ortigas Center
Twin towers
Skyscraper office buildings in Metro Manila